Sony PIX (Formerly also known as Set Pix) is an Indian English language pay television movie channel owned by Culver Max Entertainment. The channel mainly airs American live action and animated Hollywood movies in English with also dubbed in Hindi, Tamil and Telugu languages.

History
Sony PIX Launched in April 2006 as a library re-run English movie channel until 31 March 2011. From 2006 to 2011, the channel broadcast various classic old American English movies. On 1 April 2011, the channel was revamped and started airing new and some popular content from Sony Pictures Entertainment until 2017.

From 2013, Sony PIX signed a deal with MGM Studios to premiere the studio's new titles on television; with this deal Sony PIX aired James Bond films and Hobbit series.

From 2015, Sony PIX signed a deal with NBCUniversal to air Universal Pictures latest releases. Furthermore, in June 2018 Sony PIX signed a movie content deal with Warner Bros.On 2017 it was planned to launch Sony pix 2 but it was cancelled

Programming
Currently, Sony PIX Have movie distribution license with NBCUniversal, Sony Pictures Entertainment, Warner Bros. Discovery, Lionsgate, Disney And Paramount Pictures.

Sony PIX also broadcasts films with the audio feed of Hindi, Tamil, and Telugu Languages.

Sports
Since its launch Sony PIX broadcast FIFA Football events up till 2015.

Premiere Nights
Sony PIX holds movie premiere events in selected cities which allows fans to watch movies before their release.

Sony Le Plex HD

Sony Le Plex HD was the second English Movie channel from Sony Pictures Networks India
this channel was discontinued on 31 December 2018 at 00:00 hours

See also
 Sony Le Plex HD
 List of Indian television stations

References

External links 
 

Television stations in Mumbai
Movie channels in India
Television channels and stations established in 2006
Sony Pictures Entertainment
English-language television stations in India
Sony Pictures Networks India